C. bigelovii may refer to:

Chromolaena bigelovii, Bigelow's false thoroughwort, a flowering plant species
Coreopsis bigelovii, the Bigelow coreopsis, a flowering plant species
Crossosoma bigelovii, the ragged rockflower, a flowering plant species
Cylindropuntia bigelovii, the teddy bear cholla, a cactus species

Synonyms
Cirsium bigelovii, a synonym of Cirsium muticum, a flowering plant species